Miodrag Radović (Serbian Cyrillic: Миодраг Радовић; born 18 December 1957) is a former Yugoslav and Serbian footballer who played as a defender.

Career
Radović spent the majority of his career at his parent club Partizan. He made 154 official appearances and scored four goals in the Yugoslav First League from 1976 to 1987. In 1986, Radović was loaned to Swedish side Degerfors IF. He also spent four seasons with Turkish club Altay, before retiring from the game in 1991.

At international level, Radović was capped twice for Yugoslavia between 1983 and 1984.

Honours
Partizan
 Yugoslav First League: 1982–83

References

External links
 
 
 
 
 

1957 births
Living people
People from Odžaci
Yugoslav footballers
Serbian footballers
Association football defenders
FK Partizan players
Degerfors IF players
Altay S.K. footballers
Yugoslav First League players
Division 2 (Swedish football) players
Süper Lig players
Yugoslavia international footballers
Yugoslav expatriate footballers
Yugoslav expatriate sportspeople in Sweden
Yugoslav expatriate sportspeople in Turkey
Expatriate footballers in Sweden
Expatriate footballers in Turkey
FK Drina Zvornik managers
FK Partizan non-playing staff
Serbian football managers